James Davis (born March 19, 1976) is an American former sprinter who specialized in 400 m and 200 m. He has won the gold medal in the 4 × 400 metres relay race on 2008 IAAF World Indoor Championships in Valencia, Spain.

References

1976 births
Living people
American male sprinters
Place of birth missing (living people)
Pan American Games medalists in athletics (track and field)
Pan American Games silver medalists for the United States
Athletes (track and field) at the 2003 Pan American Games
World Athletics Indoor Championships winners
Medalists at the 2003 Pan American Games